Ledyard is both a surname and a given name. Notable people with the name include:

Surname:
 Gari Ledyard (born 1932), Sejong Professor of Korean History
 Grant Ledyard (born 1961), National Hockey League defenseman
 Hal Ledyard (1931–1973), gridiron football player
 Henry Ledyard (1812–1880), American politician
 Isaac Ledyard (1755–1803), American physician
 Lewis Cass Ledyard (1851–1932), American lawyer
 John Ledyard (1751–1789), American explorer and adventurer
 William Ledyard (1738–1781), colonel in the Continental Army during the American Revolutionary War

Middle name:
 Seth Ledyard Phelps (1824-1885), United States Navy officer, diplomat, and politician  

Given name:
 C. Ledyard Blair (1867–1949), American investment banker and yachtsman
 Ledyard Blair Clark (1917–2000), American liberal journalist and political activist, grandson of C. Ledyard Blair
 Ledyard Mitchell (1881–1964), American automobile executive and American football player
 G. Ledyard Stebbins (1906–2000), American botanist and geneticist
 Ledyard Tucker (1910–2004), American mathematician